Amlan Datta (Born:-17 June, 1924 – Death :- 18 February, 2010) was an economist and educationist from West Bengal, India.

Biography
Amlan Datta was an intellectual and scholar, born 17 June 1924 at Bagichagaon in the Comilla district of Bengal Presidency (now in Bangladesh). His father was Ashwini Kumar Datta and mother was Sunitibala Devi. He finished his school at the Ishwar Pathshala at Comilla, took 1st class first in B.A (Hons.) in economics from the Presidency College, then affiliated with the University of Calcutta and earned a first class fourth in MA from the same university, both with distinction. His wife Mrs Kitty Datta was a professor of English at the Scottish Church College. His eldest brother Anil Datta was University topper, an economist, went on to become IAS officer and was the man behind India's 1st five-year Plan. His only sister, Geeti Sen, was topper among the woman in Matriculate exam. Another brother, Anindya Datta was Professor Emeritus, Economics, Plymouth State College, New Hamspshire.His youngest brother Arghya Datta is editor of a multi disciplinary Bengali Magazine Samatat.

After finishing his education in 1946, he started as a lecturer in Asutosh College, of the University of Calcutta, and went on to be a lecturer at the University of Calcutta in 1948. Though the youngest of the professors of Economics department, he took classes of three of the twelve compulsory half-papers. His three half-papers were Public Finance, Economic Development of selected countries and Thoughts of three Eminent Economists, one of them being Marx. Subsequently, he was the Pro-Vice Chancellor of Calcutta University during 1972–74. He also served as the Vice Chancellor of the University of North Bengal (1974–77). Then he joined the Gandhian Institute of Studies as director in 1978 and thereafter, as vice chancellor of Visva-Bharati University, Santiniketan. He also taught as visiting lecturer at Banaras Hindu University and the University of Brussels.

As a writer on socioeconomic, political and philosophical subjects, Datta's works drew inspiration from Tagore, Mahatma Gandhi and Nehru. His ideas on the Soviet enigma, the riddle of Gandhism, east–west blended Nehru's contribution to democracy and secularism and Tagore's aesthetic mysticism and universalism. However, his writings fall to note the grave global danger of thanatological terrorism as another aspect of post Marxian materialist dialectics. His collected essays attempt to assess their merits in many proposition and make positive suggestions. He begins: "In theory, Marxist give primacy to economics; in practice, to politics. This, they will protest, is a mechanical distinction; what matters is political economy. How far does that take us? The Indian economy is not homogeneous whole. Nor far that matter are the industrially developed economics one whole".

An opponent of parochialism and dogmatism, Datta evaluated prevailing political and economic doctrines including Marxist communism. He wrote along these lines for The Radical Humanist, The Economic Weekly, and Thought. One of the stalwarts of the Radical Humanist movement he was also one of the last survivors of those who had been in the company of M N Roy and Ellen.

He lectured in the United States of America, talked about Mahatma Ghandhi in Australia and lectured about Rabindranath Tagore in China. He talked about economic development and education challenges at many forums in India and abroad (Japan, Denmark and the West Indies). He also represented India at the United Nations Social Development Commission in 1979. He was invited to the Kamala Lecture Series in 1982 by the University of Calcutta.

Amlan Dutta's field of study and research encompassed economics, literature, politics, sociology and education, although his views and opinions often became the subject of heated arguments and controversies.

His first book was published in 1953, titled "For Democracy" and copies of the book were sent to Albert Einstein and Bertrand Russell who were then busy preparing the anti-war resolution which was later circulated among the heads of the States. Russell sent a congratulatory letter to the young lecturer. Professor Datta authored 21 books in English and Bengali. He was the joint editor of Quest magazine along with Abu Sayeed Ayub. He was conferred the Ananda Puraskar (1972), Jagattarini Award, Kamala Award and Vidyasagar Award (1999), Desikottam Award (2008).

He died of a heart attack at his Salt Lake City residence on 18 February 2010.

Awards and recognitions
Desikottam Award from Visva Bharati University
Jagattarini Award and Kamala Award from Calcutta University
Ananda Puraskar from Anandabazar Group

Bibliography

Bengali

Ganatantra O Ganayug (1967, Ananda Publishers)
Teen Diganta (1978, Ananda Publishers)
Byakti, Yukti, Samaj (1978, Ananda Publishers)
Kamala Baktrita O Anyanya Bhashan (1984)
Gandhi O Rabindranath (1986, Ananda Publishers)
Dwanda O Uttaran (1989, Ananda Publishers)
Bikalpa Samajer Sandhane (1994, Ananda Publishers)
Anya Ek Biplab (1999, Ananda Publishers)
Je Katha Balite Chai (2009, Ananda Publishers)
Mukti Tore Petei Hobe

English
Religion, Education and Development (1968)
The Third Movement (1987, Ananda Publishers)
A New Radicalism and Other Essays (1989, Minarva – Calcutta)
For A Quiet Revolution (1997, Papyrus – Calcutta)
On The Edge of A Century (1999, Subarnarekha – Santiniketan)
Towards The Good Life (Subarnarekha – Santiniketan)
Socialism, Democracy and Industrialization (Allen & Unwin)
Perspectives of Economic Development (Macmillan)
Beyond Socialism (Popular Prakashan)
The Gandhian Way (North Eastern Hill University)
Transitional Puzzles (Sage Publication)
Towards an Alternative Economic Order (Aksharmudra – Pune)

References

External links

Jijnasa – Special Issue on Amlan Datta
Quotes By Amlan Dutta – Bangla Quotes by Amlan Datta
https://www.imdb.com/name/nm3073391/
https://www.imdb.com/title/tt3952870/reference/

1924 births
2010 deaths
Bengali writers
Cumilla District
University of Calcutta alumni
Academic staff of the University of Calcutta
People associated with Santiniketan
Scholars from Kolkata
Educators from West Bengal